Antidesma venosum, commonly known as the tassel-berry, is a species of small dioecious tree in the family Phyllanthaceae. It is native to Africa, China and Indochina.

Numerous small, sessile flowers are produced on drooping catkin-like spikes, which are about 10 cm long. The flowers produce an unpleasant smell, and the tree is in fruit for more than a month during late summer. Each small, oval-shaped fruit measures about 8 x 4 mm in size. They are initially fleshy green, and change to bright red and eventually purplish black as they ripen. The fruit are utilized by many species of animal and bird.

References

Flora of Africa
Flora of China
Flora of Indo-China
venosum
Taxa named by Edmond Tulasne